Biritai (Biri) is a Lakes Plain language of Papua, Indonesia. It is named after Biri village in East Central Mambermano District, Mamberamo Raya Regency.

Phonology 
The following inventory is taken from Donohue (2017), with a very small consonant inventory typical of the Lakes Plain languages.

Consonants 

In an earlier paper co-authored by Donohue, the approximants /j w/ are also included as phonemes. The authors note that Biritai is typologically unusual for missing series of velar, nasal and liquid consonants.

Vowels

References

Lakes Plain languages
Languages of western New Guinea